Franc Berneker (October 4, 1874 – May 16, 1932) was a 19th- and early-20th-century Slovene tomb sculptor, who had a strong impact on Slovenj Gradec gaining recognition for his work in bronze, marble and monuments. His art focus went from realism to modernism to psychology, drama and an exploration of the relationship between worked and unworked, smooth and rough. He studied with Edmund von Hellmer at the Vienna Academy of Fine Arts and Ivan Zajec on monuments of national heroes His art work is displayed at the Resau Art Nouveau Network.

List of sculptures 

Below is a list of some of Berneker's sculptures:

 A Girl
 Gradišče, Slovenj Gradec
 The Drowned Couple
 Oton Župančič
 Drama
 Victims
 Zdenka Vidic and Mira Ban
 Female Head
 Wrestlers
 Monument commemorating Trubar
 Model for Turner's Tomb
 Model for a Monument for Adamič and Lunder.

Exhibitions 
Berneker's work has been shown around the world in museums including:

 Belgrade (1912)
 Bled (1911)
 Celje (1940)
 Ljubljana (1902, 1911, 1912, 1913, 1938, 1940)
 London (1906)
 Slovenj Gradec (1984, 2001)
 Trieste (1907)
 Vienna (1904, 2003).

References 

1874 births
1932 deaths